Thermoelectric cooling uses the Peltier effect to create a heat flux at the junction of two different types of materials. A Peltier cooler, heater, or thermoelectric heat pump is a solid-state active heat pump which transfers heat from one side of the device to the other, with consumption of electrical energy, depending on the direction of the current. Such an instrument is also called a Peltier device, Peltier heat pump, solid state refrigerator, or thermoelectric cooler (TEC) and occasionally a thermoelectric battery. It can be used either for heating or for cooling, although in practice the main application is cooling. It can also be used as a temperature controller that either heats or cools.

This technology is far less commonly applied to refrigeration than vapor-compression refrigeration is. The primary advantages of a Peltier cooler compared to a vapor-compression refrigerator are its lack of moving parts or circulating liquid, very long life, invulnerability to leaks, small size, and flexible shape. Its main disadvantages are high cost for a given cooling capacity and poor power efficiency (a low coefficient of performance or COP). Many researchers and companies are trying to develop Peltier coolers that are cheap and efficient. (See Thermoelectric materials.)

A Peltier cooler can also be used as a thermoelectric generator. When operated as a cooler, a voltage is applied across the device, and as a result, a difference in temperature will build up between the two sides. When operated as a generator, one side of the device is heated to a temperature greater than the other side, and as a result, a difference in voltage will build up between the two sides (the Seebeck effect). However, a well-designed Peltier cooler will be a mediocre thermoelectric generator and vice versa, due to different design and packaging requirements.

Operating principle 

Thermoelectric coolers operate by the Peltier effect (one of three phenomena that make up the thermoelectric effect). The device has two sides, and when a DC electric current flows through the device, it brings heat from one side to the other, so that one side gets cooler while the other gets hotter. The "hot" side is attached to a heat sink so that it remains at ambient temperature, while the cool side goes below room temperature. In special applications, multiple coolers can be cascaded or staged together for lower temperature, but overall efficiency (COP) drops significantly. The maximum COP of any refrigeration cycle is ultimately limited by the difference between the desired (cold side) and ambient (hot side) temperature (the temperature of the heat sink). The higher the temperature difference (delta), the lower the maximum theoretical COP.

Construction

Design 
Two unique semiconductors, one n-type and one p-type, are used because they need to have different electron densities. The alternating p & n-type semiconductor pillars are placed thermally in parallel to each other and electrically in series and then joined with a thermally conducting plate on each side, usually ceramic removing the need for a separate insulator. When a voltage is applied to the free ends of the two semiconductors there is a flow of DC current across the junction of the semiconductors, causing a temperature difference. The side with the cooling plate absorbs heat which is then transported by the semiconductor to the other side of the device. The cooling ability of the total unit is then proportional to the total cross section of all the pillars, which are often connected  in series electrically to reduce the current needed to practical levels. The length of the pillars is a balance between longer pillars, which will have a greater thermal resistance between the sides and allow a lower temperature to be reached but produce more resistive heating, and shorter pillars, which will have a greater electrical efficiency but let more heat leak from the hot to cold side by thermal conduction. For large temperature differences, longer pillars are far less efficient than stacking separate, progressively larger modules; the modules get larger as each layer must remove both the heat moved by the above layer and the waste heat of the layer.

Materials 

Requirements for thermoelectric materials:
 Narrow band-gap semiconductors because of room-temperature operation;
 High electrical conductivity (to reduce electrical resistance, a source of waste heat);
 Low thermal conductivity (so that heat doesn't come back from the hot side to the cool side); this usually translates to heavy elements
 Large unit cell, complex structure;
 Highly anisotropic or highly symmetric;
 Complex compositions.

Materials suitable for high efficiency TEC systems must have a combination of low thermal conductivity and high electrical conductivity. The combined effect of different material combinations is commonly compared using a figure of merit known as ZT, a measure of the system's efficiency. The equation for ZT is given below, where alpha is the Seebeck coefficient, sigma is the electrical conductivity and kappa is the thermal conductivity.

There are few materials that are suitable for TEC applications since the relationship between thermal and electrical conductivity is usually a positive correlation. Improvements in reduced thermal transport with increased electrical conductivity are an active area of material science research. Common thermoelectric materials used as semiconductors include bismuth telluride, lead telluride, silicon–germanium, and bismuth antimonide alloys. Of these, bismuth telluride is the most commonly used. New high-performance materials for thermoelectric cooling are being actively researched.

The working elements must be in an isolated casing, and the best geometry is a plane. Usually this will be them being sandwiched between a pair of ceramic plaques, sealed (or not).

Identification and characteristics 

The vast majority of thermoelectric coolers have an ID printed on the cooled side.

These universal IDs clearly indicate the size, number of stages, number of couples, and current rating in amps, as seen in the adjacent diagram.

Very common Tec1-12706, square of 40 mm size and 3–4 mm high, are found for a few dollars, and sold as able to move around 60 W or generate a 60 °C temperature difference with a 6 A current. Their electrical resistance will be of 1–2 ohm magnitude.

Strengths and weaknesses 

There are many factors motivating further research on TEC including lower carbon emissions and ease of manufacturing. However, several challenges have arisen.

Benefits 
A significant benefit of TEC systems is that they have no moving parts. This lack of mechanical wear and reduced instances of failure due to fatigue and fracture from mechanical vibration and stress increases the lifespan of the system and lowers the maintenance requirements. Current technologies show the mean time between failures (MTBF) to exceed 100,000 hours at ambient temperatures.

The fact that TEC systems are current-controlled leads to another series of benefits. Because the flow of heat is directly proportional to the applied DC current, heat may be added or removed with accurate control of the direction and amount of electrical current. In contrast to methods that use resistive heating or cooling methods that involve gasses, TEC allows for an equal degree of control over the flow of heat (both in and out of a system under control). Because of this precise bidirectional heat flow control, temperatures of controlled systems can be precise to fractions of a degree, often reaching precision of milli Kelvin (mK) in laboratory settings. TEC devices are also more flexible in shape than their more traditional counterparts. They can be used in environments with less space or more severe conditions than a conventional refrigerator. The ability to tailor their geometry allows for the delivery of precise cooling to very small areas. These factors make them a common choice in scientific and engineering applications with demanding requirements where cost and absolute energy efficiency are not primary concerns.

Another benefit of TEC is that it does not use refrigerants in its operation. Prior to their phaseout some early refrigerants, such as chlorofluorocarbons (CFCs), contributed significantly to ozone depletion. Many refrigerants used today also have significant environmental impact with global warming potential or carry other safety risks with them.

Disadvantages 
TEC systems have a number of notable disadvantages. Foremost is their limited energy efficiency compared to conventional vapor-compression systems and the constraints on the total heat flux (heat flow) that they are able to generate per unit area.  This topic is further discussed in the performance section below.

Performance 
Peltier (thermoelectric) performance is a function of ambient temperature, hot and cold side heat exchanger (heat sink) performance, thermal load, Peltier module (thermopile) geometry, and Peltier electrical parameters.

The amount of heat that can be moved is proportional to the current and time.
, where P is the Peltier coefficient, I is the current, and t is the time. The Peltier coefficient depends on temperature and the materials the cooler is made of. Magnitude of 10 watt per ampere are common, but this is offset by two phenomena: 
 According to Ohm's law, a Peltier module will produce waste heat itself,
, where R is the resistance. 
 Heat will also move from the hot side to the cool side by thermal conduction inside the module itself, an effect which grows stronger as the temperature difference grows.

The result is that the heat effectively moved drops as the temperature difference grows, and the module becomes less efficient. There comes a temperature difference when the waste heat and heat moving back overcomes the moved heat, and the module starts to heat the cool side instead of cooling it further. A single-stage thermoelectric cooler will typically produce a maximal temperature difference of 70 °C between its hot and cold sides.

Another issue with performance is a direct consequence of one of their advantages: being small. This means that:

 the hot side and the cool side will be very close to each other (a few millimeters away), making it easier for the heat to go back to the cool side, and harder to insulate the hot and cool side from each other
 a common 40 mm × 40 mm can generate 60 W or more—that is, 4 W/cm2 or more—requiring a powerful radiator to move the heat away

In refrigeration applications, thermoelectric junctions have about 1/4 the efficiency compared to conventional (vapor compression refrigeration) means: they offer around 10–15% efficiency (COP of 1.0–1.5) of the ideal Carnot cycle refrigerator, compared with 40–60% achieved by conventional compression-cycle systems (reverse Rankine systems using compression/expansion). Due to this lower efficiency, thermoelectric cooling is generally only used in environments where the solid-state nature (no moving parts), low maintenance, compact size, and orientation insensitivity outweighs pure efficiency.

While lower than conventional means, efficiency can be good enough, provided:

 temperature difference is kept as small as possible, and,  
 the current is kept low, because the ratio of moved heat over waste heat (for same temperature on the hot and cool side) will be . 
However, since low current also means a low amount of moved heat, for all practical purposes the coefficient of performance will be low.

Uses 

Thermoelectric coolers are used for applications that require heat removal ranging from milliwatts to several thousand watts. They can be made for applications as small as a beverage cooler or as large as a submarine or railroad car. TEC elements have limited life time. Their health strength can be measured by the change of their AC resistance (ACR). As a cooler element wears out, the ACR will increase.

Consumer products 
Peltier elements are commonly used in consumer products. For example, they are used in camping, portable coolers, cooling electronic components, mattress pad sleeping systems and small instruments. They can also be used to extract water from the air in dehumidifiers. A camping/car type electric cooler can typically reduce the temperature by up to 20 °C (36 °F) below the ambient temperature, which is 25 °C if the car reaches 45 °C under the sun. Climate-controlled jackets are beginning to use Peltier elements. 

Thermoelectric coolers can be used to cool computer components to keep temperatures within design limits or to maintain stable functioning when overclocking. A Peltier cooler with a heat sink or waterblock can cool a chip to well below ambient temperature. Some Intel Core CPUs from the 10th generation and onwards are capable of using the Intel Cryo technology, which uses a combination of thermoelectric cooling and a liquid heat exchanger to deliver a much greater cooling performance than normally possible with standard liquid cooling.

Industrial 
Thermoelectric coolers are used in many fields of industrial manufacturing and require a thorough performance analysis as they face the test of running thousands of cycles before these industrial products are launched to the market. Some of the applications include laser equipment, thermoelectric air conditioners or coolers, industrial electronics and telecommunications, automotive, mini refrigerators or incubators, military cabinets, IT enclosures, and more.

In fiber-optic applications, where the wavelength of a laser or a component is highly dependent on temperature, Peltier coolers are used along with a thermistor in a feedback loop to maintain a constant temperature and thereby stabilize the wavelength of the device.

Some electronic equipment intended for military use in the field is thermoelectrically cooled.

Science and imaging 
Peltier elements are used in scientific devices. They are a common component in thermal cyclers, used for the synthesis of DNA by polymerase chain reaction (PCR), a common molecular biological technique, which requires the rapid heating and cooling of the reaction mixture for denaturation, primer annealing, and enzymatic synthesis cycles.

With feedback circuitry, Peltier elements can be used to implement highly stable temperature controllers that keep desired temperature within ±0.01 °C. Such stability may be used in precise laser applications to avoid laser wavelength drifting as environment temperature changes.

The effect is used in satellites and spacecraft to reduce temperature differences caused by direct sunlight on one side of a craft by dissipating the heat over the cold shaded side, where it is dissipated as thermal radiation to space. Since 1961, some unmanned spacecraft (including the Curiosity Mars rover) utilize radioisotope thermoelectric generators (RTGs) that convert thermal energy into electrical energy using the Seebeck effect. The devices can last several decades, as they are fueled by the decay of high-energy radioactive materials.

Peltier elements are also used to make cloud chambers to visualize ionizing radiation. Just by passing an electric current, they can cool vapors below −26 °C without dry ice or moving parts, making cloud chambers easy to make and use.

Photon detectors such as CCDs in astronomical telescopes, spectrometers, or very high-end digital cameras are often cooled by Peltier elements. This reduces dark counts due to thermal noise. A dark count occurs when a pixel registers an electron caused by thermal fluctuation rather than a photon. On digital photos taken at low light these occur as speckles (or "pixel noise").

They are used in Energy Dispersive Spectrometers to cool the sensor crystals, eliminating the necessity of large liquid nitrogen dewars.

See also 
 Thermoacoustics

References 

Cooling technology
Thermoelectricity